Dera Nawab Sahib railway station (Urdu and ) is located in Ahmadpur East Tehsil, Bahawalpur district of Punjab province of the Pakistan.This is one of the first railway station in sub-continent. It was built by Nawab Of Bahawalpur. It has a beautiful building. It was Constructed in 1856.

See also
 List of railway stations in Pakistan
 Pakistan Railways

References

External links

Railway stations in Bahawalpur District
Railway stations on Karachi–Peshawar Line (ML 1)